This list of fossil arthropods described in 2009 is a list of new taxa of trilobites, fossil insects, crustaceans, arachnids and other fossil arthropods that have been described during the year 2009, as well as other significant discoveries and events related to arthropod paleontology that occurred.

Radiodonts

Arachnids

Insects

Trilobites

References

2009 in paleontology